mBridge is a platform developed by a group of central banks, including the Hong Kong Monetary Authority (HKMA), the Bank of Thailand (BoT), the Central Bank of the United Arab Emirates (CBUAE), the Digital Currency Research Institute of the People's Bank of China (PBC DCI), and the BIS Innovation Hub Hong Kong Centre (BISIH Hong Kong Centre). The platform is designed to support real-time, peer-to-peer, cross-border payments and foreign exchange transactions using CBDCs, and it is based on a new blockchain called the mBridge Ledger. The platform is designed to ensure compliance with jurisdiction-specific policy and legal requirements, regulations, and governance needs.

A pilot involving real corporate transactions was conducted on the platform among participating central banks, selected commercial banks, and their customers in four jurisdictions. The project has focused on developing hypothetical use cases in the Greater Bay Area (GBA) as a way to demonstrate the technology and operational improvements that mBridge can offer. The next phases of the project are expected to include additional use cases and participants, and further work on the legal and governance framework.

References 

Central bank digital currencies
Monetary reform